Mesothen samina is a moth of the subfamily Arctiinae. It was described by Herbert Druce in 1896. It is found in Panama.

References

 

Mesothen (moth)
Moths described in 1896